The formation of a Commission on the Future of Higher Education, also known as the Spellings Commission, was announced on September 19, 2005, by U.S. Secretary of Education Margaret Spellings. The nineteen-member commission was charged with recommending a national strategy for reforming post-secondary education, with a particular focus on how well colleges and universities are preparing students for the 21st-century workplace, as well as a secondary focus on how well high schools are preparing the students for post-secondary education. In the report, released on September 26, 2006, the Commission focuses on four key areas: access, affordability (particularly for non-traditional students), the standards of quality in instruction, and the accountability of institutions of higher learning to their constituencies (students, families, taxpayers, and other investors in higher education). After the report's publication, implementation of its recommendations was the responsibility of U.S. Under Secretary of Education, Sara Martinez Tucker (appointed August 2006).

Formation and motivation
A significant motivation behind the Spellings Commission's formation was the fear that the American higher education system is deteriorating and failing to prepare the American workforce for the rigors and competitiveness of the globalized marketplace. The Spellings Commission opens its report by stating that “higher education in the United States has become one of our greatest success stories.” but moving into the 21 century, the commission bluntly states in its preamble how [foreign higher education systems] are passing us by at a time when education is more important to our collective prosperity than ever. The commission emphasizes the relationship between industry, education, and the government.

Presidential commissions on education have been relatively common since The Truman Report in 1947. Other notable groups include President Eisenhower's "Committee on Education Beyond the High School," (1956), President Kennedy's Task Force on Education (1960), and President Reagan's National Commission on Excellence in Education, which produced A Nation at Risk (1983).

Membership
 Charles Miller (Chairman) Private Investor, Former Chairman of the Board of Regents, University of Texas System
 Nicholas Donofrio, Executive Vice President,  Innovation and Technology, IBM Corporation
 James J. Duderstadt, President Emeritus, University Professor of Science and Engineering; Director, The Millennium Project, University of Michigan
 Gerri Elliott, Corporate Vice President, Worldwide Public Sector, Microsoft Corporation
 Jonathan N. Grayer, Chairman and CEO, Kaplan, Inc.
 Kati Haycock, Director, The Education Trust
 James B. Hunt, Jr., Chairman, Hunt Institute for Educational Policy and Leadership; Former Governor of North Carolina
 Arturo Madrid, Murchison Distinguished Professor of Humanities, Department of Modern Languages and Literatures, Trinity University
 Robert Mendenhall, President, Western Governors University
 Charlene R. Nunley, President, Montgomery College
 Catherine B. Reynolds, Chairman and CEO, Catherine B. Reynolds Foundation, EduCap, Inc.
 Arthur J. Rothkopf, Senior Vice President and Counselor to the President, U.S. Chamber of Commerce; President Emeritus, Lafayette College
 Richard (Rick) Stephens, Senior Vice President, Human Resources and Administration, The Boeing Company
 Louis W. Sullivan, President Emeritus, Morehouse School of Medicine, Former Secretary of the U.S. Department of Health and Human Services
 Sara Martinez Tucker, President and CEO, Hispanic Scholarship Fund
 Richard Vedder, Adjunct Scholar, American Enterprise Institute, Distinguished Professor of Economics, Ohio University
 Charles M. Vest, President Emeritus, Professor of Mechanical Engineering, Massachusetts Institute of Technology
 David Ward, President of the American Council on Education (did not sign the final report)
 Robert M. Zemsky, Chair and Professor, The Learning Alliance for Higher Education, University of Pennsylvania

The Published Report
The published report (pdf) (first available on September 26, 2006 as a pre-publication copy), was titled A Test of Leadership: Charting the Future of U.S. Higher Education. It proposed several solutions to the problems facing higher education today, corresponding to the primary concerns of the commission: access, affordability, quality, accountability, and innovation.

Access
According to the commission, access to higher education "is unduly limited by the complex interplay of inadequate preparation, lack of information about college opportunities, and persistent financial barriers" (Commission Report 5). The commission blames the lack of communication between colleges and high schools as one source of the problem. The report states that "forty-four percent of university faculty members say students aren't well prepared for college-level writing, in contrast to the 90 percent of high school teachers who think they are prepared" and "only 17 percent of seniors are considered proficient in mathematics, and just 36 percent are proficient in reading." In response to this, the Commission proposed linking the expectations of college professors for incoming freshman to the criteria required for students to graduate from high school by increasing communication between the two groups. In order to accomplish this, the Report "strongly encourages early assessment initiatives that determine whether students are on track for college".  Another proposal of the Report is an increase in the use of open content and open source at the collegiate level to increase access to more people.

Affordability
Another dilemma that the commission faces regarding the access to higher education is the availability for low-income families and, to a lesser extent, students of minority groups. The report states that "there is ample evidence that qualified young people from families of modest means are far less likely to go to college than their affluent peers with similar qualifications." In an effort to lessen the stress of paying for college, the commission's report recommended shortening the FAFSA form to encourage more people to apply for financial aid. The report also calls for greater productivity and efficiency of the financial aid system. State funding for higher education has fallen to the lowest levels the nation has seen in two decades, and the report proposes that Universities be held accountable for their "spending decisions... based on their own limited resources."

Quality
The report urges colleges and universities to embrace innovative ideas for new methods of teaching, such as distance learning, to improve the quality of higher education.  The report also addresses the idea that organization and nationwide reform are key parts in repairing the problems of higher education.  Modifying the curricula and assessments on a nationwide level would help distinguish students in the academic world.

Accountability
The commission proposes creating a public database, where statistics and other information about colleges and universities could be viewed by all in order to clarify the haziness of accountability.  The information that would be made available in the proposed database would include the cost, price, admissions data, and college completion rates of colleges.  The database could eventually even contain data such as the "learning outcomes of students".  The Commission argues that colleges might have a more vested interest in the success of their students if this information were made public to prospective students and their parents.

Innovation
American universities have not adequately prioritized innovation and creativity as an important learning outcome. The commission advocates that "policymakers and educators need to do more
to build America’s capacity to compete and innovate by investing in critical skill sets and basic research. Institutions as well as government agencies have failed to sustain and nurture innovation in our colleges and universities. The commission finds that the results of scholarly research on teaching and learning are rarely translated into practice, especially for those working at the grassroots level in fields such as teacher preparation and math and science education" (15). Although the report does not point this out, the accepted practice of research in higher education requires scholars to fit their research in with pre-existing scholarly conversations, which can limit the development of new ideas and risky experimentation. Additionally, universities and government officials enacting policy and controlling monetary resources have been slow to adapt to the future and reluctant to provide the resources necessary for creative ventures: "with the exception of several promising practices, many of our postsecondary institutions have not embraced opportunities for innovation, from new methods of teaching and content delivery to technological advances to meeting the increasing demand for lifelong learning. We also find that for their part, both state and federal policymakers have failed to make supporting innovation a priority by adequately providing incentives for individuals, employers, and institutions to pursue more opportunities for innovative, effective, and efficient practice" (16). If universities were re-structured according to interdisciplinary emphases and topics, we would foster innovation more efficiently: "At a time when innovation occurs increasingly at the intersection of multiple
disciplines (including business and social sciences), curricula and research funding remain largely contained in individual departments" (16).

Criticism and controversy
Commission member David Ward refused to sign the final version, citing "several issues of serious concern" including the report's tendency to attribute problems with multiple causes entirely to the state of higher education.

After the publication of the report, it has been the target of criticism from prominent individuals in higher education, including Robert Berdahl, president of the Association of American Universities (and not a commission member), who stated that the report lacked a "nuanced understanding" of the realities of higher education.

Privacy advocates have criticized the call for a national student database, which Spellings and the commission have argued should include information on individual students' performance.

Microsoft's Gerri Elliot, a commission member, sparred with other commission members over the inclusion of a discussion of the benefits of open source software and open content.

Response to commission recommendations
The Higher Education Consumers Resource took exception to the report, citing inadequate research on root cause of the problems. With over 80% of all Americans having successfully completed 12 years of school, that fewer than 25% go on to successfully complete a college degree is meaningful. In Ohio alone, there are eight colleges that graduate less than 35% of the full-time freshman class within six years. This indicates serious institutional barriers to success within those institutions. Higher Education Consumers Resource believes academic and career advising from independent sources not beholden to the college or university is one step towards reducing dismal successful college completion rates.

But the National Center for Public Policy and Higher Education's "Measuring Up 2006: The National Report Card on Higher Education" focuses on most of the same areas as Spellings Commission report. The "report card" looks at individual states and assesses the status of their higher education since 2000. Although the National Center for Public Policy and Higher Education is not directly affiliated with the commission, there is significant overlap in not only the areas of concern, but in some of the membership (notably James B. Hunt, Jr. and Arturo Madrid). Spellings is quoted as saying that she is proud her report has similarities to the National Center's report.

One of the most controversial proposed implementations of the report's recommendations is the proposal for a federally managed system to record the progress of individual college students. The Department of Education has proposed revamp or expand the current Integrated Postsecondary Education Data System, arguing that a database is necessary to sufficiently assess the status of universities and college students nationwide. University and pro-privacy advocates fear that such a plan would require universities to submit much more information causing vast increases in cost and time commitment to the universities and could be regarded as an invasion of students' privacy. The Department of Education addresses some of these anxieties on a "Myth vs. Fact" page posted to the DOE web site on September 29, 2006.

Some universities are beginning to use and modify learning management systems to create information systems that provide for a means of articulating institutional, classroom and personal learning outcomes at all levels as well as means to consistently rate performance toward those objectives. Alternative solutions are being researched, while the Spellings commissions was seeking funding for test projects in the 2008 federal budget. "Goal Aware Tools" development effort is one such attempt.

Additionally, some disciplinary organizations, such as the National Council of Teachers of English and the Council of Writing Program Administrators, have begun to demonstrate the ways in which member institutions engage in assessment practices designed to improve student learning. They make the case, advanced in documents like the NCTE-WPA White Paper on Writing Assessment in Colleges and Universities, that good assessment is locally contextualized, based in the principles of the discipline, and must be used to improve teaching and learning at the local level.

Implementation
Since the US Department of Education published the Spellings Commission report on September 26, 2006, Spellings has pushed for progress in implementing the recommendations, progress that faces the challenge of working with limited time before the 2008 presidential elections. This push for tangible changes in the remainder of her term has included:
 The appointment of Sara Martinez Tucker as U.S. Under Secretary for Education by the U.S. Senate. Tucker was nominated by President George W. Bush in August 2006, but not confirmed until December. With Spellings, Tucker has created a more limited list of short and long-term goals for implementing the Commission Report's recommendations, a list headed by plans to increase the efficiency of the financial aid system, to create greater access to higher education, and to ensure that high school students are better prepared for college.
 Plans to simplify the Free Application for Federal Student Aid (FAFSA), and to notify students before the spring of their senior year whether or not they would qualify for aid.
 A push to make comparative evaluation of individual universities' performance more possible, particularly through revamping or expanding the current Integrated Postsecondary Education Data System (a push that has been met with some resistance by higher education interests).

Related acts 
The Higher Education Opportunity Act (enacted August 2008) has stated:

Nothing in this section shall be construed to permit the Secretary to establish any criteria that specifies, defines, or prescribes the standards that accrediting agencies or associations shall use to assess any institution’s success with respect to student achievement.

References

External links
 A Test of Leadership: Charting the Future of U.S. Higher Education
 The Commission on the Future of Higher Education's home page
 Inside Higher Ed, "New Top Fed for Higher Ed", January 3, 2007.
 Department of Education press release, "Secretary Spellings Announces New Commission on the Future of Higher Education," September 19, 2005
 Commission Report Draft, August 9, 2006
 "Measuring Up 2006: The National Report Card on Higher Education"
 Article on changes made to the report after ratification
 NCTE-WPA White Paper on Writing Assessment in Colleges and Universities
 Higher Education Opportunity Act

Academia in the United States
Education policy in the United States
Higher education in the United States